Events from the year 1127 in Ireland.

Incumbents
 High King of Ireland: Toirdelbach Ua Conchobair

Events

Building starts on Cormac's Chapel, on the Rock of Cashel, Cashel, County Tipperary (and lasts until 1134).

References